Adkins Arboretum is a 400-acre native garden and arboretum located within Tuckahoe State Park at 12610 Eveland Road, Ridgely, Maryland. The grounds contain five miles of paths through meadows and native plant gardens on the Eastern Shore of Maryland. Its gardens contain a "living collection" of more than 600 species of native shrubs, trees, wildflowers and grasses, used to promote land stewardship practices in the Chesapeake Bay region.

Native plant nursery 
The native plant nursery boasts the area's largest selection of ornamental native trees, shrubs, perennials, grasses, ferns, and vines, all ready to take home. The arboretum hosts open house events and native plant sales in April and September. Plants are for sale on the Visitor's Center patio throughout the growing season.

The arboretum is dedicated to promoting the appreciation and conservation of the region's native plants and is actively engaged in conserving and managing the native meadows, woods, and wetlands that define the landscape in Caroline County on Maryland's Eastern Shore. In 2008, the arboretum launched its nursery greening program, an initiative to implement best management practices at its native plant nursery. As part of this initiative, and with support from Chesapeake Bay Gateways Network, the arboretum constructed a rain garden at its native plant nursery in 2010 and 2011. In addition, the arboretum maintains meadows of native warm season grass to provide wildlife habitat and help preserve this threatened ecosystem.

Visitor's Center

Orientation 

Visits begin at the aboretum's visitor's center. Staff orient visitors to the arboretum, providing maps of the grounds, brochures about what to see along the walks, information about what's in bloom, and the schedule for guided walks. Visitors may also borrow audio tours. Display racks feature literature about the arboretum site and special programming.

Art Gallery/Meeting Room 
The visitor's center meeting room houses art exhibitions throughout the year and serves as a meeting room for various workshops, seminars, and meetings. The arboretum hosts an ongoing exhibition series of artwork on natural themes by regional artists, as well as an annual juried show held in February and March of each year and an outdoor sculpture show during the summer.

Gift Shop 
The arboretum gift shop offers gifts for gardeners, nature enthusiasts, and children. Located in the visitor’s center lobby, the shop recently underwent a transformation to offer a new look and new amenities. Café tables that overlook the meadow provide a welcoming spot for relaxing while children engage in preschool or homeschool programs. Coffee service and Wi-Fi are also offered.

Plant Sale Area 
A selection of native plants is available for purchase under the visitor's center pergola during the growing season.

Grounds

Arboretum Paths 

Five miles of paths wind through the arboretum grounds. The Blockston Branch path offers a walk through mature bottomland hardwood forest and is handicap accessible. Paths lead around the arboretum's meadows, where many creatures, including quail, bluebirds, deer, fox, and turkeys, forage for food. A mix of mature upland and bottomland hardwood forests and younger pine forests provide a rich habitat for flora and fauna. Thickets of native azaleas and mountain laurel bloom in May, and woodland wildflowers bloom from late winter to summer. Look for wood ducks and beaver along Tuckahoe Creek and Piney Branch. The arboretum's Tuckahoe Valley trail connects to Tuckahoe State Park's trail system for longer hikes.

Emilie's Play Garden 

Visitors can venture past the goat pen to Emily’s Play Gardento explore. Visitors can make mud pies at the mud kitchen, peek into a passionflower teepee, climb on balancing logs, pick chocolate peppermint in the herb spiral, care for vegetables in the mandala garden, smell blooming wildflowers, meditate in a labyrinth, observe birds that visit a solar-powered fountain, hide in a willow den, and explore much more. Learn all about how the garden was designed to harmonize with nature’s patterns and about the beautiful native plants (many of them edible) that make this garden home to our wildlife friends.

First Light Village Playspace 
Tucked into upland forest along the Upland Walk, First Light Village is a nature playspace, a special place for children to enjoy creative outdoor play. In contrast to traditional playgrounds, nature playspaces are made almost entirely of natural materials. Designed and constructed by a local Eagle Scout with a keen interest in Native American lore, the playspace features two wigwams, a turtle-shaped tree stump ring, a snake balance beam, and more.

Bird Watching 
The arboretum is designated an Important Bird Area by Audubon MD-DC. Its diverse habitat of woodlands, meadows, and wetlands make it an ideal site for birding. The woodland and meadow paths, meadow overlook, and wetland boardwalk provide ideal spots for bird-watching. Visitors can explore the world of birds and butterflies that inhabit the site with a take-along information guide.

Education

Master Naturalist Training 
The arboretum is the first host site for the Maryland Master Naturalist Program for the Coastal Plain, an extension of the University of Maryland. Individuals accepted into the Master Naturalist training course receive 48 hours of instruction, including hands-on experience outdoors. All classes are taught by experts in the subject. The curriculum includes Maryland Natural History, Flora & Fauna, Ecologic Principles, How Humans Affect the Landscape, The Science of Science, and Teaching & Interpretation.

Adult and Youth Programs 

While the arboretum’s 400 acres showcase its mission of land stewardship, its education programs are designed to inspired and guide both children and adults to explore and appreciate the region’s natural beauty and take action to contribute to the protection and enhancement of our backyards, neighborhoods, and communities. Programs for adults and children are offered in three sessions per year: winter, spring/summer, and fall. Members receive discounted program fees.

Summer Camps 
For the past fifteen years, Adkins Arboretum’s Summer Nature Camps have given children the opportunity to enjoy their precious summer the old-fashioned way—outdoors! Campers will make new friends and lifelong memories while exploring the arboretum’s woodland, meadow, stream, and wetland habitats. From grazing on blackberries to splashing in the Blockston Branch, the arboretum’s summer nature camps provide children with a truly enchanted experience.

Outdoor Education Programs for School Groups 
The arboretum offers dynamic, hands-on outdoor education activities designed to enhance young peoples' experiences in natural outdoor settings, as well as enrich current academic curriculum. Students explore diverse arboretum habitats, including meadows, deciduous and coniferous forests, wetlands, and streams. Outdoor education has been linked to improved academic achievement and encourages stewardship, pride, and ownership. The arboretum's education programs are designed to maximize student involvement in their environment. Such involvement develops problem-solving, critical thinking, and investigation skills vital to cultivating a meaningful awareness of the human-environmental connection.

Guided Walks 
The arboretum’s diverse plant communities can be explored on guided walks led by a docent naturalist. Visitors can explore the bottomland forest and upland paths, meander through majestic beech trees, traverse the native meadows, and follow the narrow Tuckahoe Creekside path. Guided walks are free for members and free with admission for the general public. Tours begin at the visitor’s center and last approximately one hour.

Book Club 
The Arboretum Book Club promotes the arboretum's mission through monthly book discussions about conservation issues. Meetings are typically held at the arboretum on Tuesday afternoons as detailed in the schedule below. During Covid-19 restrictions, meetings are conducted via Zoom. Readings include nonfiction, fiction, essays, biography, and poetry, and will focus on horticulture, natural history, science, ecology, history, and environmental issues. Members share leading discussions of their readings.

History 
The arboretum was originally established in 1972 to be the Maryland state arboretum on the grounds of Tuckahoe State Park. It first opened in the 1980s as a result of a major donation from Leon Andrus, a native of Queen Anne's County. The arboretum derives its name from the Adkins family, an Eastern Shore family of conservationists who were friends with Andrus. When Andrus died in 1989, he left a bequest to the arboretum's endowment.

Its original mission was to display all of Maryland's forest types; however, in the 1990s, its mission was revised to emphasize the display and study of the Delmarva Peninsula's indigenous plant communities. In 1998, its operations were converted to a public/private partnership, with Maryland granting a 50-year lease to the Friends of Adkins Arboretum. The arboretum is supported by grants and donations.

See also 
 List of botanical gardens in the United States

References

External links 
 Adkins Arboretum
 Adkins Arboretum $1 M Gift
 Adkins Arboretum Facebook page

Arboreta in Maryland
Botanical gardens in Maryland